South Jamesport is a hamlet in the town of Riverhead, Suffolk County, New York, United States. The community is located on the north shore of the Great Peconic Bay. South Jamesport has a post office with ZIP code 11970, which opened on February 2, 1893. On South Jamesport beach there are different types of sand, black sand and golden sand.

References

Hamlets in Suffolk County, New York
Hamlets in New York (state)